Cyrestis camillus elegans is a butterfly subspecies in the genus Cyrestis and the family Nymphalidae. It is known from Madagascar.

References

Cyrestinae
Butterflies described in 1832
Butterfly subspecies